Ophioblennius clippertonensis is a species of combtooth blenny from the eastern Pacific Ocean which is endemic to Clipperton Island, a French minor territory off the coast of Central America. It can be found on rocky reefs which are subjected to the tidal surge.

References

Fish described in 1962
clippertonensis